Bundin is a rural locality (a khutor) in Kamennoyarsky Selsoviet, Chernoyarsky District, Astrakhan Oblast, Russia. The population was 22 as of 2010. There are 3 streets.

Geography 
Bundin is located on the Volga River, 86 km northwest of Chyorny Yar (the district's administrative centre) by road. Kamenny Yar is the nearest rural locality.

References 

Rural localities in Chernoyarsky District